TYO may refer to:
 The IATA airport code for the Tokyo metropolitan area that includes both Haneda International Airport (HND) and Narita International Airport (NRT)
 Port of Tokyo, by seaport code
 Tokyo Station, by JR East station code
 TY.O, an album by Taio Cruz
 Tokyo Stock Exchange
 Tamil Youth Organisation
 TYO Animations